Markivka Raion was a raion (district) in Luhansk Oblast of eastern Ukraine. The administrative center of the raion was an urban-type settlement of Markivka. The raion was abolished on 18 July 2020 as part of the administrative reform of Ukraine, which reduced the number of raions of Luhansk Oblast to eight, of which only four were controlled by the government.

After the proclamation of the separatist Luhansk People's Republic on 27 April 2014 the province Luhansk became a battlefield of the War in Donbass. Markivka Raion stayed under Ukrainian governmental control. The separatist  referendum on 11 May on independence was not held in the Raion.

Demographics 
As of the 2001 Ukrainian census:

Ethnicity
 Ukrainians: 93%
 Russians: 5.7%
 Belarusians: 0.4%

Notable residents 

Leonid Zhunko (born 1951), politician, born in Krasne Pole village

References

Former raions of Luhansk Oblast
1920 establishments in Ukraine
Ukrainian raions abolished during the 2020 administrative reform